Anthology is a greatest hits collection of The Babys spanning the years 1976-1980. Originally released in 1981 on Chrysalis Records, it was remastered and reissued with bonus tracks on Capitol Records in 2000.  The album charted at #138 on the Billboard 200.

The song "Money" had not appeared on any Babys official studio album.

Track listing

Original 1981 release 
 "Head First" (J. Waite/W. Stocker/T. Brock) - 3:57
 "Isn't It Time" (J. Conrad/R. Kennedy) - 4:03
 "Midnight Rendezvous" (J. Waite/J. Cain) - 3:36
 "Money (That's What I Want)" (B. Gordy/J. Bradford) - 2:56
 "Back On My Feet Again" (J. Waite/D. Bugatti/F. Musker) - 3:18
 "Give Me Your Love" (J. Waite/W. Stocker/M. Corby/T. Brock) - 3:37
 "Turn and Walk Away" (J. Waite/J. Cain) - 3:10
 "Every Time I Think of You" (J. Conrad/R. Kennedy) - 4:00
 "If You've Got the Time" (J. Waite/W. Stocker/M. Corby/T. Brock) - 2:33
 "Sweet 17" (J. Waite/W. Stocker/J. Cain) - 2:47

2000 re-issue 
 "If You've Got the Time" (J. Waite/W. Stocker/M. Corby/T. Brock) - 2:33
 "Head Above the Waves" (J. Waite) - 2:52
 "I Love How You Love Me" (Barry Mann/Larry Kolber) - 2:21
 "Looking for Love (Live)" (J. Waite/W. Stocker/M. Corby/T. Brock) - 4:43
 "Isn't It Time" (J. Conrad/R. Kennedy) - 4:03
 "Give Me Your Love" (J. Waite/W. Stocker/M. Corby/T. Brock) - 3:37
 "Silver Dreams" (J. Waite/T. Brock) - 3:00
 "Money (That's What I Want)" (B. Gordy/J. Bradford) - 2:56
 "Every Time I Think of You" (J. Conrad/R. Kennedy) - 4:00
 "Head First" (J. Waite/W. Stocker/T. Brock) - 3:57
 "Love Don't Prove I'm Right" (J. Waite/W. Stocker/T. Brock) - 2:47
 "Back on My Feet Again" (J. Waite/D. Bugatti/F. Musker) - 3:18
 "Midnight Rendezvous" (J. Waite/J. Cain) - 3:36
 "Anytime" (J. Waite/T. Brock/R. Phillips/W. Stocker/J. Cain) - 3:21
 "Turn and Walk Away" (J. Waite/J. Cain) - 3:10
 "Sweet 17" (J. Waite/W. Stocker/J. Cain) - 2:47
 "Gonna Be Somebody" (J. Waite)/J. Cain/T. Brock) - 2:57

Personnel 
From 1985 Chrysalis VK 41351 CD liner notes

Group

 John Waite – vocals, bass (1,2,4,6,8,9)
 Wally Stocker – lead guitar, rhythm guitar (7,10)
 Tony Brock – drums, percussion (1,4)
 Michael Corby – rhythm guitar (2,6,9), keyboards (2,6,9)
 Ricky Phillips - bass (3,5,7,10)
 Jonathan Cain - keyboards (3,5,7,10), rhythm guitar (7,10), vocals (7,10)

Additional Musicians

 Michael Corby - rhythm guitar, keyboards - "Money"
 Jack Conrad - bass - "Everytime I Think Of You"
 Kevin Kelley - piano - "Everytime I Think Of You"

Background Vocals

 The Babettes (Lisa Freeman Roberts, Pat Henderson, Myrna Mathews) - "Isnt' It Time"
 Anne Marie Leclerc - "Turn And Walk Away"
 Marti McCall, Myrna Mathews, Diana Lee - "Everytime I Think Of You"

Production

 Ron Nevison (1,2,4,6,8)
 Brian Christian, Bob Ezrin - "If You've Got The Time"
 Keith Olsen - (3,5,7,10)

Strings and horns arranged and conducted by Jimmy Haskell - "Everytime I Think Of You"

Reference list 

The Babys albums
1981 compilation albums
Albums produced by Keith Olsen
Albums produced by Ron Nevison
Albums produced by Bob Ezrin
Chrysalis Records compilation albums